Chow Yu Hui (born 11 July 1983) is a Malaysian politician who has served as the Member of Parliament (MP) for Raub since November 2022. He served as Member of the Pahang State Legislative Assembly (MLA) for Bilut from May 2013 to May 2018 and Tras from May 2018 to November 2022 He is a member of the Democratic Action Party, a component party of the Pakatan Harapan (PH) coalition.

Election results

References

Living people
1983 births
21st-century Malaysian politicians